Diana Gomes may refer to:
 Diana Gomes (footballer) (born 1998), Portuguese footballer
 Diana Gomes (swimmer) (born 1989), Portuguese swimmer

See also
Diana Gómez, Spanish actress